Saros cycle series 110 for lunar eclipses occurs at the moon's ascending node, 18 years 11 and 1/3 days. It contains 71 or 72 events, depending on multiple calculations. Solar Saros 117 interleaves with this lunar Saros with an event occurring every 9 years 5 days alternating between each saros series.

This lunar saros is linked to Solar Saros 117.

See also 
 List of lunar eclipses
 List of Saros series for lunar eclipses

Notes

External links 
 www.hermit.org: Saros 110

Lunar saros series